Keeper of the Great Seal can refer to:
Keeper of the Great Seal of Canada
Keeper of the Great Seal of Scotland
Keeper of the Great Seal of the State of Illinois
Keeper of the Great Seal of Wisconsin
Lord Keeper of the Great Seal of England

See also
Keeper of the Seals, France
Keeper of the Privy Seal of Scotland
Great Officer of State